Zhangxin Qaghan or Alp Külüg Bilge Qaghan was the eleventh ruler of Uyghurs. His personal name was Yaoluoge Hu (藥羅葛胡). He succeeded his uncle in 833.

Reign 
Chinese records state that he sent an embassy lead by Princess Taihe to Tang, accompanied with 7 women horse-archers and two Shatuo captives on 16 June 835.

His peace policy with China proved him an unpopular ruler. This led to a rebellion in 839 by the Sogdian official An Yunhe (安允合) and Uyghur minister Chai Lei (柴勒). Qaghan was able to defeat and kill them, but a subsequent battle against another Uyghur official, general Jueluowu (掘羅勿) along with the Shatuo chief Zhuye Chixin was lost. Zhangxin committed suicide following the battle. He was succeeded by Qasar Qaghan.

References 

839 deaths
9th-century monarchs in Asia
9th-century Turkic people
Medieval suicides
Heads of state who committed suicide
Ädiz clan